The P-30 "Khrustal" also referred to by the NATO reporting name "Big Mesh" in the west is a 2D E band/F band radar developed and operated by the former Soviet Union.

Development 
The P-30 was developed by the All-Union Scientific Research Institute of Radio Engineering (VNIIRT) as an early warning ground control and interception radar for the Soviet Air Defence Forces, airforce and navy of the Soviet Union. Crystal was a development of an earlier radar design, the P-20 radar with which it shares many similarities. The radar was developed under the direction of chief designer V. Samarin and by 1955 the radar had completed state trials and was accepted into service.

In 1958 the P-30 was upgraded to provide a 10-15% improvement in the detection range as well as improvements to the systems reliability, the modernised variant entered service in 1959 after completion of state trials. The P-30 has now been superseded by its successors, the P-35 and P-37 radar.

Description 
The P-30 is a semi-mobile radar consisting of a trailer mounting the control cabin and transmitter equipment, two Zil trucks carrying the power supply equipment and antenna trailers. The antenna system of the P-30 is composed of two open frame truncated parabolic antenna accomplishing both transmission and reception. Both antenna are fed by a stacked beam composed of six feed horns. The radar uses two antenna to determine target altitude by the V-beam system with azimuth scanned mechanically. The upper antenna is tilted to an angle of 25 degrees from horizontal which results in each target appearing twice on the indicator, the distance between the two allows the targets altitude to be approximately estimated by the operator. The left hand side of the lower antenna carried the antenna array of the NRS-20 IFF secondary radar, which was used to identify detected aircraft as friend or foe.

Operators 
The P-30 was operated by the Soviet Union from 1955 and though they have since become obsolete, they were passed down to successor states after the fall of the Soviet Union. The radar has been exported and continues to serve in some areas around the world.

See also 
 P-20 radar
 List of radars

External links
 VNIIRT

References 

Russian and Soviet military radars
Military vehicles introduced in the 1950s